Sarah Nampijja (born June 8, 1990) recognized professionally as Sera was a  Ugandan singer and songwriter. She rose to prominence on the Ugandan entertainment scene in 2012 with her hit single "contagious" in which she featured Jeff Blaise.

Personal life
Sera was born in 1990, the first of three children born to John Kakooza and Elizabeth Wolwa.

Music
In 2012 while appearing on "Katogo" a local music based show on Record Tv, she described herself as a fusion artiste noting "I find ragga nice to me, I find dancehall good to me and find Rnb very interesting for me"

Sera signed her first professional music contract in 2009 at the age of 19 when she was signed onto Kampala based music label Swangz Avenue

Sera made her music debut on Ugandan airwaves with "Delivered" a song in which she featured then dancehall artiste KidFox. She reached mainstream success when she sang "Contagious" with Jeff Blaze. She followed this with "Fire" a single which was not widely received in the country.

At the time of her death she was believed to be in the process of creating a new video for the song in an effort to overturn its ill fortune. She was ranked among Uganda's best 256 artists of all time.

Death 
Sera succumbed to stomach ulcers after developing complications on her way from Masaka where she had traveled to bury the father of her music producer Ken.

According to her close friend and fellow musician Viboyo Oweyo who was with her during her last moments, Sera first fainted while in a village in Masaka, before being rushed to local clinic where the clinic attendants later advised that she be taken to the much bigger Kitovu hospital, she is reported to have died as they reached the hospital premises.

In the wake of her death there were rumors circulating on social media that seemed to suggest that Julius Kyazze the Managing Director of Swangz Avenue had been arrested in connection with Sera's death but he came out to quash them, stating that "Please don't believe the smear campaign that I have been arrested, I'm free" 

Sera's Mom Elizabeth Wolwa also came out at her burial to attest to the fact that her daughter and Kyazze were close friends and that she regularly mentioned him in their conversations.

Posthumous releases 
In 2016 her record label Swangz Avenue released a dancehall single titled "One Ting Man" in which Sera featured Zambia's K'millian.

Discography

Songs
Fire
Contagious
Sunrise
One ting man
Surrender
No more
Ntwala
Delivered

References

External links 
"Sera's Nampijja Thru K N L Lenses"

1990 births
2012 deaths
21st-century Ugandan women singers
Kumusha